The Bengkoka Peninsula is a peninsula in northern of Sabah, Malaysia. It consists of coastal with swampy areas. The peninsula become the area where the South China Sea meets the Sulu Sea.

Geology 
The peninsula is formed since the Oligocene with various materials such as sandstone, mudstone, siltstone, shale, conglomerate, lignite with minor limestone and tuff.

Climate and biodiversity 
The peninsula area generally received mean annual rainfall ranging from 2,000 millimetres to 2,500 millimetres. In the peninsula located the Tambalugu Forest Reserve where  several mammals including barking deer and wild boar are found in the area. Together with Kudat Peninsula, it is part of the Tun Mustapha Marine Park which includes coral reefs conservation. The peninsula is also known for its mosquito fauna with about 37 species of mosquitoes from seven genera were found in six villages in the area.

References 

Peninsulas of Asia
Landforms of Sabah